Philippidis or Filippidis (Greek: Φιλιππίδης) is a Greek surname. The female version of the name is Philippidou or Filippidou. Philippidis is a patronymic surname which literally means "the son of Philippos (Filippos)". Notable examples include:

Men 
Daniel Philippidis (c.1750-1832), scholar, figure of the modern Greek Enlightenment
George Philippidis, Greek American cleantech leader (renewable fuels and power)
Konstadinos Filippidis, Greek pole vaulter
Petros Filipidis, Greek actor and director
George Apostolos Filippides, Greek/American Chairman, President & CEO (High-Tech & Green Energy Executive)

Women 
Sophia Philippidou, Greek actress

See also 
For more information about the history of the name, see Philippides.

Greek-language surnames
Surnames
Patronymic surnames
Surnames from given names